Monica Doti (born 12 May 1970) is a Brazilian table tennis player. She competed at the 1992 Summer Olympics and the 1996 Summer Olympics.

References

1970 births
Living people
Brazilian female table tennis players
Olympic table tennis players of Brazil
Table tennis players at the 1992 Summer Olympics
Table tennis players at the 1996 Summer Olympics
Sportspeople from São Paulo